The 1995 NCAA Rifle Championships were contested at the 16th annual competition to determine the team and individual national champions of NCAA co-ed collegiate rifle shooting in the United States. The championship was hosted by the United States Naval Academy at the Bancroft Hall Rifle Range in Annapolis, Maryland. 

West Virginia returned to the top of the team standings after a one-year absence, finishing 54 points ahead of  Air Force. This was the tenth team title for the Mountaineers.

The individual champions were, for the smallbore rifle, Oleg Seleznev (Alaska), and Benjamin Belden (Murray State), for the air rifle.

Qualification
Since there is only one national collegiate championship for rifle shooting, all NCAA rifle programs (whether from Division I, Division II, or Division III) were eligible. A total of six teams ultimately contested this championship.

Results
Scoring:  The championship consisted of 120 shots by each competitor in smallbore and 40 shots per competitor in air rifle.

Team title

Individual events

References

NCAA Rifle Championships
1995 in shooting sports
NCAA Rifle Championships
NCAA Rifle Championship